Robyn Marie Wong (born 23 November 1970) is a New Zealand cyclist. She competed at the 2004 Summer Olympics in Athens, in the women's cross-country.

Wong was born in 1970 at Lower Hutt to Chinese parents. The family moved to the Wairarapa early in 1971, where Wong grew up. She was married to Dave Hicks and they have one son together, Jack, who was born in 2012.

References

External links
 

1970 births
Living people
New Zealand female cyclists
Olympic cyclists of New Zealand
Cyclists at the 2004 Summer Olympics
Sportspeople from Lower Hutt
New Zealand people of Chinese descent
Cyclists at the 2006 Commonwealth Games
Commonwealth Games competitors for New Zealand
21st-century New Zealand women